Haji Mohammad Tsamkani (1920–2012) was an Afghan politician who held the post of interim President of Afghanistan during the period of the Soviet-backed Democratic Republic of Afghanistan. Previously, he served as deputy head of state aka vice chairman of the Presidium of the Revolutionary Council under Babrak Karmal.

He reached the position after the resignation of Babrak Karmal. A non-party member, a tribal leader with power and connections in key areas of provinces bordering Pakistan, his influence extended inside Pakistan as well.  However, Mohammed Najibullah was in charge of the country, due to his powerful positions of Director of the KHAD and General Secretary of the People's Democratic Party of Afghanistan. It was during his term in office that the Soviet Union indicated willingness to negotiate and remove some troops from Afghanistan. His term was also marked by the creation of a new Constitution.

References

1920 births
2012 deaths
20th-century heads of state of Afghanistan
Presidents of Afghanistan
Afghan Muslims
Vice presidents of Afghanistan
People's Democratic Party of Afghanistan politicians
Afghan Tajik people
1980s in Afghanistan